Trinity Lutheran High School is a private high school in Seymour, Indiana, operated by an association of 15 congregations of the Lutheran Church–Missouri Synod. It was rated a four star school by the Indiana Department of Education in 2018.

See also
 List of high schools in Indiana

References

External links
 

Private high schools in Indiana
Buildings and structures in Jackson County, Indiana

Secondary schools affiliated with the Lutheran Church–Missouri Synod
Lutheran schools in Indiana
Educational institutions established in 2000
2000 establishments in Indiana